The 1953 Penn Quakers football team represented the University of Pennsylvania during the 1953 college football season.  In head coach George Munger's final season at Penn, the Quakers compiled a 3–5–1 record and were outscored 152 to 96 by their opponents.  Although they finished with a losing record, Penn played a tough schedule, opposing four different ranked teams in a row, and defeating No. 10 Navy, 9–6. Their three losses against ranked teams were by a combined 24 points, including a ten-point loss against Notre Dame.

Schedule

References

Penn
Penn Quakers football seasons
Penn Quakers football